Constitutional Assembly elections were held in El Salvador on 17 December 1961. The result was a victory for the  National Conciliation Party, which won all 54 seats.

Results

References

Bibliography
Political Handbook of the world, 1961. New York, 1962. 
Elections in the Americas : a data handbook/ ed. by Dieter Nohlen, Vol. 1. [Oxford] [u.a.] : Oxford Univ. Press, 2005.
Anderson, Thomas P. 1971. Matanza: El Salvador's communist revolt of 1932. Lincoln: University of Nebraska Press.
Institute for the Comparative Study of Political Systems. 1967. El Salvador election factbook, March 5, 1967. Washington: Institute for the Comparative Study of Political Systems.
Kantor, Harry. 1969. Patterns of politics and political systems in Latin America. Chicago: Rand McNally & Company.
McDonald, Ronald H. 1969. "Electoral behavior and political development in El Salvador." Journal of politics 31, 2:397-419 (May 1969).
Montgomery, Tommie Sue. 1995. Revolution in El Salvador: from civil strife to civil peace. Boulder: Westview.
Williams, Philip J. and Knut Walter. 1997. Militarization and demilitarization in El Salvador's transition to democracy. Pittsburgh: University of Pittsburgh Press.

El Salvador
Legislative elections in El Salvador
1961 in El Salvador
Election and referendum articles with incomplete results